Bidens simplicifolia is a species of flowering plant in the family Asteraceae. It is endemic to Ecuador. Its natural habitat is subtropical or tropical moist lowland forests. It is threatened by habitat loss.

References

simplicifolia
Endemic flora of Ecuador
Critically endangered plants
Taxonomy articles created by Polbot